The Forgotten Day is a Sitcom television drama produced by TVB. It stars Roger Kwok, Shaun Tam, David Chiang and Grace Wong. Amy Wong Sum-wai serves as the producer.

Cast and Characters

Main Characters
Roger Kwok as Ng Yiu-chong (吳耀中), a waiter. He indirectly causes Mung Yat-yin to suffer from amnesia. Feeling guilty, he helps Mung Yat-yin to search for his lost memory.
Shaun Tam as Mung Yat-yin (蒙一言), an interior designer. He is kidnapped and suffers from transient global amnesia due to a head injury.
David Chiang as Peter Mung Kwan-sui (蒙君瑞), Mung Yat-yin and Mung Siu-dou’s father.
Grace Wong as Freeya Yau Fei-yee (游菲兒), Mung Yat-yin’s wife. She is missing after her husband’s injury and amnesia.
Roxanne Tong as Dr. "Yan" Nam Hoi-ching (藍海晴), a clinical psychologist who treats Mung Yat-yin’s amnesia.

Major Supporting Characters
Zoie Tam as Maya Sze Man-nga (施文雅), Ng Yiu-chong’s wife.
Elvina Kong as Mable Ng Shun-mei (吳順美), a taxi driver and Ng Yiu-chong’s younger sister.
Anthony Ho as Ng Yiu-chung (吳耀松), Ng Yiu-chong’s younger brother who is mentally disabled.
Max Cheung as Evans (伊雲思), Mable’s ex-husband.
Lisa Lau as Mung Siu-dou (蒙小豆), a veterinary nurse and Mung Yat-yin’s younger sister.

References

Chinese television series